Valeri Aleksandrovich Sorokin (born 27 March 1987) is a Russian football player.

Club career
He made his debut in the Russian Football National League for FC Dynamo Bryansk on 1 August 2020 in a game against FC Orenburg, as a starter.

References

External links
 
 Profile by Russian Football National League
 

1987 births
Sportspeople from Kirov, Kirov Oblast
Living people
Russian footballers
Association football midfielders
FC Dynamo Kirov players
FC Spartak Kostroma players
FC Dynamo Bryansk players
FC Nosta Novotroitsk players